Sir Robert Eccles Snowden (22 March 1880 – 30 June 1934) was an Australian politician.

He was born in Hobart. In 1919 he was elected to the Tasmanian House of Assembly as a Nationalist member for Denison. He held the seat until his resignation in 1924. Snowden died in London in 1934.

References

1880 births
1934 deaths
Nationalist Party of Australia members of the Parliament of Tasmania
Members of the Tasmanian House of Assembly
20th-century Australian politicians